Makarony po-flotski (Russian: макароны по-флотски, literally navy-style pasta) is a Russian dish made of cooked pasta (typically macaroni, penne or fusilli) mixed with stuffing made of stewed ground meat (usually beef or pork) and fried onions, and seasoned with salt and black pepper. Originally served in maritime forces, the dish became popular in Russia due to its simplicity, low cost and short time of preparation. Makarony po-flotski became especially popular after World War II during times of poverty in the Soviet Union.

Preparation
The pasta is cooked in salted boiling water. The onions are well chopped, while meat is minced. After pouring some oil on the pan the chopped onions are fried and after they get a golden color the meat is added to them to get fried. The stuffing is seasoned with salt and pepper. When the meat is fried and the pasta is cooked they are mixed together. The dish is usually served without any additions, but can be eaten with pickles.

The ground meat can be replaced by canned meat (tushonka). Average "canned beef" tushonka has lots of spices and is juicy enough to substitute the onions, while it also has a decent amount of meat.

See also
 Spaghetti bolognese
 Spaghetti with meatballs
 List of pasta dishes
 List of Russian dishes

References

Russian cuisine
Soviet cuisine
Pasta dishes
Ground meat